Tom or Thomas Knight may refer to:

Politicians
 Thomas Knight (Australian politician) (born 1935), Australian politician
 Thomas Knight (MP for Shrewsbury) (c. 1475–1518/20), English politician
 Thomas Knight (MP for Kent) (1735–1794), English politician
 Thomas Knight (MP for Canterbury) (c. 1701–1781), English politician
 Thomas E. Knight (1898–1937), American lawyer and politician

Sports
 Tommy Knight (footballer) (1865–?), English footballer
 Tom Knight (cricketer) (born 1993), Derbyshire cricket player
 Tom Knight (American football) (born 1974), former American football cornerback

Actors
 Thomas Knight (actor) (died 1820), English actor and dramatist
 Tom Knight (actor), played Mr Granger in Harry Potter and the Chamber of Secrets
 Tommy Knight (born 1993), child actor, best known for playing Luke Smith in The Sarah Jane Adventures

Others
 Thomas Andrew Knight (1759–1838), horticulturalist and botanist
 Tom Knight (scientist), American computer scientist
 Thomas Knight (murderer) (1951–2014), American serial killer